Evergreen Hamlet is a historic district in Ross Township, Allegheny County, Pennsylvania, USA.  It was a planned community that was founded by William Shinn in 1851.  Joseph W. Kerr (1815–1888) designed all four of the Evergreen Hamlet houses.  The community was listed on the National Register of Historic Places on September 17, 1974.

References

External links

[ National Register nomination]
Information about Evergreen Hamlet

Houses on the National Register of Historic Places in Pennsylvania
Houses in Allegheny County, Pennsylvania
Gothic Revival architecture in Pennsylvania
Georgian architecture in Pennsylvania
Pittsburgh History & Landmarks Foundation Historic Landmarks
Historic districts on the National Register of Historic Places in Pennsylvania
National Register of Historic Places in Allegheny County, Pennsylvania